Pipestone Area School District, Independent School District 2689 serves the communities of Pipestone, Woodstock, Hatfield, Trosky, Holland, Ihlen and Jasper.  the district superintendent is Jim Lentz.

District schools
 Pipestone Area High School/Middle School
  Alexander Hugh Brown Elementary
 Dolson Hill Elementary

See also
List of school districts in Minnesota

References

External links
Official site 

School districts in Minnesota
Education in Pipestone County, Minnesota